Club Nouveau is an American R&B group formed by record producer/performer Jay King in 1986 in Sacramento, California, following the breakup of the Timex Social Club. The group's name (French for "New Club") was changed from its original incarnation, "Jet Set", to capitalize on the breakup. The group was signed by Warner Bros. Records, on which Club Nouveau released its first three albums. Club Nouveau's go-go version of Bill Withers's song "Lean on Me" won a Grammy award for Best R&B Song in 1987.

History
From its debut album, Life, Love & Pain, which was released in 1986, the group scored four consecutive hits: "Jealousy" (essentially an answer song responding to Timex Social Club's hit "Rumors"), "Situation #9", "Lean on Me" and "Why You Treat Me So Bad". The latter two both made it to #2 on the  Billboard R&B chart the next year, with "Lean on Me" going on to become a big Billboard Hot 100 hit. "Jealousy" also made an appearance on the soundtrack for the film Modern Girls. "Why You Treat Me So Bad" was interpolated by the hip-hop duo Luniz, on its hit single "I Got 5 on It", and subsequently by rapper/record producer Puff Daddy on his #1 R&B single "Satisfy You".

The group's original lineup consisted of Jay King, Valerie Watson, Samuelle Prater, Denzil Foster, and Thomas McElroy. Foster and McElroy soon left to form their own production team and focus on working with other acts. Prater, who had performed lead vocals on "Lean on Me," eventually left as well to pursue a solo career, but reunited with the group in 2009.

The group's next albums — beginning with Listen to the Message — were laced with an evolving social consciousness. Notable recordings include "You Ain't No Friend of Mine" from Under A Nouveau Groove; a dancehall-influenced version of the Gospel classic "Oh, Happy Day," from A New Beginning; "Let It Go" from Everything Is Black; and "What Kind of Love" from The Collection Volume I. The group also recorded "Step by Step" for the Who's That Girl soundtrack.

Club Nouveau was nominated for a Grammy for Best R&B Performance in 1987. The group's version of "Lean on Me" was its most celebrated hit, resulting in a Grammy nomination for Song of the Year in addition to winning the Grammy for Best R&B Song that same year. "Lean on Me" was also nominated for two American Music Awards, nominated and won a Bammy Award, a BRE Drummer award, a Bay Area Star award and it won two NARM (National Association of Recording Merchandisers) awards.

The 2015 lineup consists of King, Watson, and Prater.

In 2017, as part of Warner Music's divestment requirements as a result of its purchase of Parlophone, the group's Warner Bros. recordings were acquired by Tommy Boy Records, which worked 12-inch singles from its first album to clubs as a result of its emerging relationship with Warner and from being an expert in the format.

Discography

Studio albums

Singles

See also
 List of number-one hits (United States)
 List of artists who reached number one on the Hot 100 (U.S.)
 List of number-one dance hits (United States)
 List of artists who reached number one on the U.S. Dance chart
 Grammy Award for Best R&B Song
 Grammy Award for Best R&B Performance by a Duo or Group with Vocals
 30th Annual Grammy Awards

References

External links 

 

American contemporary R&B musical groups
Grammy Award winners
Warner Records artists
Musical groups from Sacramento, California